László Klauz (6 November 1961 – 28 March 2013) was a Hungarian wrestler. He competed at the 1988 Summer Olympics and the 1992 Summer Olympics. He won silver medal at the 1989 World Wrestling Championships and bronze medal at the 1986 World Wrestling Championships.

Major results

References

1966 births
2013 deaths
Hungarian male sport wrestlers
Olympic wrestlers of Hungary
Wrestlers at the 1988 Summer Olympics
Wrestlers at the 1992 Summer Olympics
World Wrestling Championships medalists
Sportspeople from Győr
20th-century Hungarian people